The Moișa is a right tributary of the river Râșca in Romania. It flows into the Râșca in the village Râșca.

References

Rivers of Romania
Rivers of Suceava County